The 2008–09 season was Leeds United F.C.'s second consecutive season in the third tier of English football and for the second year running saw them finish in the play-offs in League One. 

The season began with Gary McAllister still managing Leeds, and they appeared to be in automatic promotion contention after a promising start. However, a humiliating FA Cup exit to Football Conference side Histon saw the team's form completely collapse, and with any hope of automatic promotion having all but ended even before Christmas Day, McAllister was sacked. He was replaced by Simon Grayson, and after a nervy first few games, Grayson lifted the side from eighth to fourth, resulting in a place in the play-offs. During this time, the club recorded eleven consecutive home wins. Although to the heartbreak of Leeds fans, the club failed in the play-offs again, being defeated by Millwall in the semi-finals. During the season, Jermaine Beckford scored 34 goals in all competitions – the highest in the country. Once again, the club received the highest attendance outside the Premier League on three occasions; the largest in the play-off semi final, recording a crowd of over 37,000. Off the pitch, the club made a profit for the first time in years.

Events
This is a list of the significant events to occur at the club during the 2008–09 season, presented in chronological order (starting from 26 May 2008 and ending on 14 May 2009). This list does not include transfers or new contracts, which are listed in the transfers section below, or match results, which are in the matches section.

May
27 May: Leeds Chairman, Ken Bates denies claims that Canadian sports firm, Maple Leaf Sports are in talks to take over the club.

June
4 June: Leeds confirm they have had talks with out-of-contract West Bromwich Albion striker, Kevin Phillips, regarding a move to Elland Road. However, the former England international's agent says that it would be "unlikely" that Phillips would move to Leeds. Duncan Revie, the son of the late Leeds manager, Don says he is still interested in buying the club. Meanwhile, thieves steal an England shirt worn by Don during the 1954–55 season.
6 June: Chairman, Ken Bates denies rumours that the club have bought back their stadium, Elland Road which is currently owned by the company, Teak Commercial Limited.
16 June: The fixtures for the 2008–09 League One season are released. Leeds start away at Scunthorpe United on 9 August, with their first home game against Oldham Athletic a week later. The club's final match of the season is against Northampton Town at Elland Road.
26 June: A friendly match scheduled for 30 July against Rotherham United is cancelled due to the "reputation" of the Leeds fans.

July
4 July: The Leeds team return from their holidays for pre-season training. Leeds' opponents for the friendly match on 2 August at Elland Road are changed from Sporting Lokeren to FCV Dender after Lokeren struggle to get visas for their full team.
9 July: Assistant manager, Steve Staunton is charged with a breach of FA rule E3 following comments he allegedly made to FA doping controllers after the club's defeat to Doncaster Rovers at Wembley on 25 May 2008.
10 July: The club's new kit for the 2008–09 season is revealed, with a full white home strip, a light blue/dark blue away kit and a full yellow alternative away kit. The club encounter contractual issues with the company who had agreed and signed a two-year contract with the club on 26 May 2008 to be the new shirt sponsor. The problem will force the team to wear shirts without a sponsor for the friendly against York City on the 11th.
14 July: Gary McAllister leaves out Sébastien Carole, Anthony Elding, Trésor Kandol, Sebastian Sorsa, Ian Westlake, Curtis Weston from his squad for the pre-season tour of Ireland. Fabian Delph and Neil Kilkenny miss out due to international duty.
29 July: Leeds agree a three-year shirt sponsorship deal with online travel company NetFlights.com.

August
1 August: The squad numbers for the new season are revealed. Most notably, Carole, Westlake, Weston and Bayly are demoted to numbers 35, 37, 40 and 41 respectively, suggesting their careers at Elland Road may be coming to an end.
9 August: Frazer Richardson is named as Leeds' club captain for the 2008–09 season. Leeds win their opening game of the season with a 2–1 away victory over Scunthorpe United.
29 August: The club confirm they have been charged by the FA with making payments to an unlicensed agent during the transfer of Anthony Elding from Crewe Alexandra in January 2008.
30 August: The club's new home shirt is made available for the first time in the official club shop.

September
3 September: Leeds' first goal against Bristol Rovers on 30 August is awarded to Jermaine Beckford after there was initial confusion where the goal had in fact been an own goal by Bristol defender, Steve Elliott. The club plead guilty to the FA charge in regard to payments to unlicensed agents in the Elding transfer.
6 September: The club announce that OHS will be the club's secondary shirt sponsor for a further two seasons. OHS were the club's secondary shirt sponsors in the 2007–08 season as well.
27 September: The club's new away shirt is made available for the first time in the official club shop and online.
30 September: The club are fined £7,500, with a further suspended fine of £12,500, for using an unlicensed agent in the transfer of Anthony Elding from Stockport County in January.

October
27 October: Plans for the re-development of the East Stand of Elland Road are revealed. As part of the re-development, a hotel, arcade, shops, restaurants, bars, nightclub, office block and a new club shop will be built.

November
27 November: The club directors reveal that the audited accounts for the 14-month period to 30 June 2008 show the club have made a profit of £4,553,000. The club also announce that due to savings on VAT, ticket prices as of 1 January 2009 will feature a £1 reduction.

December
13 December: Leeds defender, Paul Huntington is given a three match ban (suspended until May 2010) and fined £1,500 following his gestures towards the Carlisle United fans at their defeat to Leeds at Elland Road in April.
18 December: The club's first team coach, Neil McDonald leaves to become new Blackburn Rovers manager, Sam Allardyce's assistant.
21 December: Gary McAllister is sacked as Leeds' manager after 11 months in charge of the club.
22 December: Assistant Manager, Steve Staunton parts company with the club following Gary McAllister's dismissal. Reserve Team Manager, Neil Thompson and Goalkeeping Coach, Andy Beasley are put in charge of first team training until a new manager is appointed. Blackpool turn down Leeds' approach for their manager, Simon Grayson.
23 December: Blackpool announce they will be taking legal action against Leeds following Simon Grayson's decision to tender his resignation which was rejected by Blackpool's directors. Several hours later, Leeds appoint Grayson as their new manager.
26 December: The club announce that former Blackburn, Leicester and Wolves coach, Ian Miller has joined Simon Grayson's new coaching team.
29 December: Midfield starlet, Fabian Delph is charged with drink driving following an incident on 23 December. Manager, Simon Grayson states that Delph is not for sale after it is reported that Arsenal and Newcastle United are ready to launch a bid for the 19-year-old in the January transfer window.

January
1 January: Leeds' academy is re-structured with Daral Pugh being promoted from Under 18s Manager to Assistant Academy Manager, with responsibilities for under-16s. Neil Redfearn joins the club to replace Pugh as Under-18s Manager.
3 January: The away match at Hereford United is postponed to due a frozen pitch.
17 January: Leeds rejects bids from two unnamed Premiership clubs for starlet, Fabian Delph.

February
2 February: Glynn Snodin returns to the club as Assistant Manager having left the club as a player over 15 years ago. The away match against Leyton Orient is cancelled a day in advance because of heavy snow.
11 February: Striker, Jermaine Beckford is charged with violent conduct and offered a three match ban following an incident in the match against Millwall two days earlier.
13 February: Jermaine Beckford pleas guilty to the violent conduct charge by FA resulting in an automatic three match suspension.

March
18 March: Following news that Sheffield United have won their battle to gain compensation from West Ham as part of the Tevez affair, Leeds chairman, Ken Bates confirms that the club will claim compensation from Sheffield United. Sheffield's relegation in 2007 saw Leeds miss out on contingency payments in relation to Premiership survival for the transfers of Rob Hulse, Matthew Kilgallon, and Ian Bennett.

April
9 April: The club announce that Blackpool's dispute with Leeds over Simon Grayson's appointment as manager of the Yorkshire club has been resolved. Leeds City Council grant the club planning permission for their plans to redevelopment the East Stand of Elland Road.
21 April: Leeds' place in the 2008–09 League One play-offs is confirmed following Scunthorpe's 3–3 draw with Northampton.
28 April: The club's reserve team win their league – The Central League, Division One East and hence quality for The Central League play-offs.

May 
1 May: The new kit for the 2009–10 season is unveiled, featuring a new NetFlights.com logo, a white and blue collar, a blue slash adjacent to the club badge and a blue Macron logo. It is announced that the new kit will be worn for the final games of the season, starting with the final league game of the season against Northampton Town.
2 May: The normal league season comes to a close with Leeds beating Northampton to finish 4th. The result means that Leeds will play Millwall in the play-off semi finals with the 1st leg away on 9 May and the 2nd leg at home on 14 May.
14 May: The club's play-off campaign comes to an end as they draw 1–1 with Millwall resulting in a 2–1 aggregate score to Millwall.

Players

Squad information

Appearances (starts and substitute appearances) and goals include those in The Premiership, The Championship (and playoffs), League One (and playoffs), FA Cup, League Cup, Football League Trophy, and UEFA Cup.
1Player first came to the club on loan and was transferred the following year.
2Player is at the club on loan
Squad includes players registered with the club on the last day of the season (14 May 2009) only.

Squad stats

Captains

Disciplinary record

Suspensions

Awards

Internal Awards

Official Player of the Year Awards

The results of the 2008–09 Leeds United F.C. Player of the Year Awards were announced at a dinner on 14 April 2008 at Elland Road .

Fans' Player of the Year: Jermaine Beckford (Runner-up: Robert Snodgrass)
Fans' Young Player of the Year: Fabian Delph (Runner-up: Aidan White)
Players' Player of the Year: Fabian Delph
Goal of the Season: Fabian Delph (vs Brighton, 17 January)
Best Contribution to Community: Andy Hughes
Chairman's Special Award: Jonathan Douglas and Ben Parker

Regional Members Clubs Player of the Year Awards

Player of the Year: Robert Snodgrass
Goal of the Season: Jermaine Beckford (vs Millwall, 9 February)

Official Goal of the Month
August: Jermaine Beckford (12 August vs Chester City)1 
September: Andy Robinson (6 September vs Crewe Alexandra) 
October–January: n/a
February: Jermaine Beckford (9 February vs Millwall)2 

1Winning goal was the player's third goal in the match.
2Winning goal was the player's first goal in the match.

External Awards

League One Team of the Week
The following Leeds players have been selected in the official League One team of the week.

11 August: Frazer Richardson, David Prutton 
8 September: Alan Sheehan 
15 September: Fabian Delph, Jermaine Beckford 
22 September: Aidan White 
29 September: Andy Robinson 
13 October: Fabian Delph, Jermaine Beckford 
27 October: Ben Parker, Fabian Delph 
3 November: Frazer Richardson 
17 November: Robert Snodgrass 
24 November: Fabian Delph, Jermaine Beckford 
29 December: Ľubomír Michalík, Fabian Delph 
19 January: Fabian Delph 
26 January: Jermaine Beckford 
2 February: Rui Marques 
23 February: Jonny Howson 
2 March: Jermaine Beckford 
30 March: Casper Ankergren, Jermaine Beckford 
6 April: Jonathan Douglas 
15 April: Fabian Delph 
20 April: Neil Kilkenny 
27 April: Casper Ankergren

Others
PFA Fans' Player of the Year (League One): Jermaine Beckford
PFA Team of the Year (League One): Fabian Delph
PFA Fans' Player of the Month (League One): Jermaine Beckford (September, March), Fabian Delph (November, January)
The Football League Golden Boot: Jermaine Beckford
League One Young Player of the Year: Fabian Delph
League One Player of the Month: Jermaine Beckford (September)
Yorkshire Evening Post Player of the Year (Leeds United): Jermaine Beckford, (Runner-up: Robert Snodgrass)

Transfers

In

1As the player was under the age of 23 at the time of the transfer, an undisclosed compensation package was due to the player's former club. 
2Although intended to be undisclosed, it was revealed on Yorkshire Radio on 18 April 2009 that the compensation paid to the player's former club was £35,000.
3Although intended to be undisclosed, chairman Ken Bates revealed on Yorkshire Radio on 19 May 2009 that the compensation paid to the player's former club was £300,000.
4Player originally joined the club on a non-contract basis, but signed a one-year contract lasting until 2009 several weeks after.
5Player joined the club on a non-contract basis.

Out

1Player was at the club on a non-contract, pay-as-you-play deal which include a clause in which either party could cancel the agreement with 7 days notice. The player was the party that triggered the clause, resulting in his release from the club.

Loans

New Contracts

1Automatically extended until 2012 if the club is promoted to The Championship.
2Player's first contract included an appearance related clause which was automatically triggered in March, resulting in a one-year contract extension commencing in June 2009.

Pre-season

Competitions

League One

Table

Results summary

Results by round

League One

Play-offs

FA Cup

Football League Cup

Football League Trophy

References

External links

Official Website
Sky Sports
Soccerbase
ESPNsoccernet 
Leeds Fans
Leeds Utd Mad

Leeds United F.C. seasons
Leeds United
Foot